Miss Russia 2022 was the 28th edition of the Miss Russia pageant. The competition was held on 25 July 2022, and was the first edition of the competition to be held since 2019. The pageant was streamed on Okko. Alina Sanko of Azov crowned Anna Linnikova of Orenburg as her successor at the end of the event.

Results

Contestants
All 25 contestants have been confirmed:

Jury
Dmitry Malikov – singer and musician
Vladimir Matetsky – composer, producer, and radio presenter
Maxim Privalov – television and radio presenter

References

External links

2022 beauty pageants
2022 in Moscow
July 2022 events in Russia
Miss Russia